The Huddersfield and District Association League is a football competition based in the area of Huddersfield, England. It was founded in 1898. The league has a total of four senior divisions and four reserve divisions. The highest senior division, Division One, sits at level 14 of the English football league system and is a feeder to the West Yorkshire and Yorkshire Amateur Leagues. The reserve divisions are not part of the league system.

The league currently has 53 teams during the 2019–20 season with one team that resigned this campaign. There are also four divisions of reserve teams consisting of 48 teams.

The most successful team in a single division since 2000, is Brackenhall United with 4 championships from 2000 to 2003. The most successful team in all divisions is Newsome, with six championships starting in the now-defunct Division Five during the 1999–2000 season and ending with the Division One championship during the 2006–07 season. Newsome again won the First Division title in the 2009–10 season and the 2014-15 season.

The league generally consists of teams around Huddersfield in West Yorkshire, however there are also a few teams located in Greater Manchester including Diggle, Uppermill 'A' and 3D Dynamos. They compete in this league because the area these clubs are based in is historically part of West Yorkshire.

History 
The league was founded in 1898. In 1919, there were 42 senior clubs and  78 junior clubs in the league. Throughout the league's history, the most players in the league at one time was 3,000. During the 2007–08 season, there were 41 divisions of junior clubs in the Huddersfield RCD Junior Football League, based in the same area, with some teams continuing to the HDAFL.

Member clubs 2019–20 

The league has a system of relegation and promotion based on club success. The bottom three teams in the first division are replaced with the top three teams in the second division. The bottom three teams in the second division are replaced by the top three teams in the third division. The bottom three teams in the third division are replaced by the top three teams in the fourth division. The system has allowed teams to rise from a lower division to a higher one within several years. Newsome were playing in the now-defunct fifth division during the 2000–01 season, but rose to the first division to win the first division in 2006–07 after playing 3 seasons in the second division.

The 2019–20 constitution is as follows:

Division One 
Berry Brow
Diggle
Fothergill and Whittles
Heywood Irish Centre
Holmbridge FC
Honley
Linthwaite Athletic (Badgers)
Newsome
Scholes A.F.C
Shepley F.C
Skelmanthorpe A.F.C
Slaithwaite United

Division Two 
AFC Lindley
AFC Dalton
Almondbury Woolpack
Britannia Sports
Colne Valley
Cumberworth
Holme Valley Academicals
Honley
Lepton Highlanders
Marsden
Moorside
Netherton
Scholes
Shelley
Slaithwaite United

Division Three 
3D Dynamos
Almondbury Working Mens Club
Brighouse Athletic
Brook Motors
Cask
Dalton Dynamos
Deighton FC
Fothergill-Whittles
Hade Edge
Junction
Littleborough
Scissett
Uppermill
Wooldale Wanderers

Division Four 
Cartworth Moor
Cleckheaton AFC
Dewsbury Town
Flockton FC
Golcar United
Grange Moor Saints
Heyside FC
Kirkburton
Mount
Rose and Crown
Sporting CAV (formerly Cavalry Arms)
Westend

Champions

Footnotes

External links 
FA Full Time
 Official website
 Soccer Weekend
 Uppermill FC Official Website

 
Sport in Huddersfield
Football leagues in England
Sports leagues established in 1898
1898 establishments in England
Football in West Yorkshire
Football competitions in Yorkshire